Peter Dajnko (23 April 1787 – 22 February 1873) was a Slovene priest, author, and linguist, known primarily as the inventor of the Dajnko alphabet, an innovative proposal for the Slovene alphabet. Dajnko was also a proficient beekeeper and wrote the first book about beekeeping in Slovene, titled Čelarstvo (Beekeeping).

Life 
Dajnko was born in the village of Črešnjevci near the town of Gornja Radgona, in what was then the Duchy of Styria in Archduchy of Austria as part of Habsburg monarchy. His parents was Filip Dajnko (Dainko) winegrower and Marija Korošec. After finishing high school in Maribor, he studied theology and philosophy at the University of Graz, where he graduated in 1814. He returned to Gornja Radgona, where he was a chaplain until 1831, when he moved to Velika Nedelja to be the parish priest. He died in Velika Nedelja.

Work 
In 1824 Dajnko wrote a book in German called Lehrbuch der windischen Sprache ("The Textbook of the Slovene Language"). There, he proposed adoption of a new alphabet for Slovene, which was to replace the traditional Bohorič alphabet, used since the late-16th century. Dajnko wanted to improve the script because of its problems with writing of sibilants. He used his alphabet in all his books published since 1824. In 1825, Franc Serafin Metelko came up with a similar proposal, complicating the issue. After 1834 it gradually came out of use with the adoption of a slightly modified version of Gaj's Latin alphabet as the new Slovene script, and in 1839 it was officially abolished.

Works 
 Sazhetek vüzhenja 'Slaven'skega po nedelah (Beginning of the Slavic Teaching on Sundays), 1816
 Evangeliomi na v'se nedéle ino 'svetke skos leto (Gospels for All Sundays and Holidays throughout the Year), 1817
 Knishiza poboshnosti sa mlade ino dorashene kristjane (Little Book of Devotions for Young and Adult Christians), 1820
 Svetega pisma sgodbe is starega ino novega sakona (Stories from the Old and New Testament of the Holy Bible), 1821
 Lehrbuch der Windischen Sprache (Slovene Textbook), 1824
 Kmet Izidor s svojimi otroki ino lydmi (Isidore the Peasant, His Children and People), 1824
 Sto cirkvenih ino drügih poboxnih pesmi med katolȣkimi kristjani slovenskega naroda na Ȣtajerskem (A Hundred Church and Other Devotional Hymns of the Catholic Christians of the Slovene Nation in Styria), 1826
 Listi ino evaŋgelji (Epistles and Gospels), 1826
 Svetega Pisma zgodbe iz Starega ino Novega Zakona (Stories from the Old and New Testament of the Holy Bible), 1826
 Posvetne pesmi med slovenskim narodom na Ȣtajerskem (Secular Hymns of the Slovene Nation in Styria), 1827
 Molitbe za katolȣke kerȣenike (Prayer for Catholic Christians), 1829
 Opravilo svete meȣe (Ceremony of the Holy Mass), 1829
 Sveti krixni pot (Stations of the Holy Cross), 1829
 Boxja sluxba kerȣanske mladosti (Divine Service of the Christian Youth), 1830
 Zhelarstvo (Beekeeping), 1831
 Чelarstvo (Beekeeping), 1831
 Knixica poboxnosti za mlade ino doraȣene kristjane (Small Book of Devotions for Young and Adult Christians), 1833
 Abecedna knixica za dexelne ȣole (Primer for Provincial Schools), 1833
 Abecedna knixica na hitro ino lehko podvuчenje (Primer for Fast and Easy Learning), 1833
 Veliki katekizem (Greater Catechism), 1833

References

External links 
  – contains books written by Peter Dajnko.

 

1787 births
1873 deaths
Slovenian philologists
Slovenian writers
Slovenian beekeepers
19th-century Slovenian Roman Catholic priests
University of Graz alumni
19th-century Austrian male writers
People from the Municipality of Gornja Radgona
19th-century Austrian Roman Catholic priests